Santa Claus is an 1898 British short  silent drama film, directed by George Albert Smith, which features Santa Claus visiting a house on Christmas Eve. The film, according to Michael Brooke of BFI Screenonline, "is believed to be the cinema's earliest known example of parallel action and, when coupled with double-exposure techniques that Smith had already demonstrated in the same year's The Mesmerist (1898) and Photographing a Ghost (1898), the result is one of the most visually and conceptually sophisticated British films made up to then." It has been described as the very first Christmas movie and a technical marvel of its time.

Plot
Two children are being placed in bed by a maid. She turns off the lights and the children fall asleep. Santa Claus enters the room from the fireplace and proceeds to trim the tree. He then fills the stockings that were previously hung on the mantle by the children. After walking backward and surveying his work, he suddenly darts at the fireplace and disappears up the chimney. The children wake up to see that Santa was in their bedroom. This film surprises everyone and leaves them to wonder how St. Nicholas disappeared.

See also
 List of Christmas films
 Santa Claus in film

References

External links 
 
 Santa Claus on YouTube

1890s British films
British silent short films
British Christmas drama films
Santa Claus in film
Films directed by George Albert Smith
Articles containing video clips
British black-and-white films
1890s drama films
1890s Christmas films
1898 short films
Silent drama films